The Brantford Red Sox are an independent team of the Intercounty Baseball League based in Brantford, Ontario. They play their home games at Arnold Anderson Stadium.

History
The Brantford Red Sox were founded in 1911 when they joined the Canadian Baseball League.

In 1915, the league folded due to World War I, and after a short hiatus the team played in the Michigan-Ontario League from 1919 to 1922. After another break they joined the Ontario League in 1930, which folded due to the Great Depression. Brantford first joined the Intercounty Baseball League in 1921 but not under the name "Red Sox"(that name was in use by the Brantford team in the Michigan-Ontario League). It was in 1946 when Brantford first had a team named the Red Sox in the I-C (intermediate division).

Championships

In 1921, they joined the Intercounty Baseball League. They won the championship 15 times.

The Brantford Red Sox's six consecutive championships from 2008 to 2013 set an Intercounty Baseball League record

Won the Pennant 11 times.

Hall of Famers
London, Ontario-born left-handed pitcher, Ron Stead, for example, led Brantford to five league titles (1960-1963, 1965) and was inducted into the Canadian Baseball Hall of Fame on June 24, 2006, in St. Marys, Ontario. Stead also won an Intercounty title with the Guelph C-Joys in 1970.

A legend of the Intercounty loop, Stead is first in all-time wins (104), strikeouts (1,231), shutouts (25), most appearances (198), most innings pitched (1,365) and complete games (116). Stead was a 10-time All-Star and four-time MVP (1960, 1963, 1965 and 1967). He was also the starting pitcher for Team Canada at the 1967 Pan American Games in Winnipeg, Manitoba, Canada.

2006 Red Sox win the Jack and Lynne Dominico Trophy

On August 25, 2006, the Brantford Red Sox won the Intercounty title for the first time since 1981 by defeating the London Majors 7-3 in Brantford before 2,000 fans at Arnold Anderson Stadium in Cockshutt Park.

Brantford, which finished third in the standings during regular season play, came on strong during the second half of the regular season and the playoffs. In the championship series, the Red Sox defeated the London Majors four games to one.

The 2006 IBL championship team includes: Jason Gotwalt, Lee Delfino, Adam Clarke, Al Stephens, Dave Parsons, Hyung Cho, Ryan Brickman, Chris Baker, Adam Vella, Wayne Forman, Raul Borjas, Brad Hogeterp, Mike Anderson, Mark Ferguson, Josh McCurdy, Steve Murray, Tyler Moe, Stefan Strecker, John Ogiltree, Aaron Boag, Tyler Burnell, Adrian Kerr, John Axford, John Mariotti, Min Soo Kim and manager/ vice-president of baseball operations Rick Johnston.

Ownership history
 Jerry Roseman (1977-78)
 Jay Johnson and Perry Davidson (1979-1984)
 Walter Gretzky, Romeo Shannelly, and John Mount (1985-1991)
 Mike Calbeck (1992-2001)
 Paul Aucoin (2002 -2014)
 Jeff Hamilton and Lee Delfino (2015-2016)
 Rick and Connie Pomerleau (2017 to present)

References

External links
 
 Ron Stead, Intercounty star recognized
 Brantford Red Sox Sold 

Baseball teams in Ontario
Sport in Brantford
Intercounty Baseball League
Baseball teams established in 1911
1911 establishments in Ontario
Michigan-Ontario League teams